Nonexist is a Swedish melodic death/thrash metal group formed by former Arch Enemy vocalist, Johan Liiva. Liiva, guitarist/bassist (on record) Johan Reinholdz (of Andromeda, Skyfire) and drummer Matte Modin (of Defleshed, Dark Funeral). They began playing together as Nonexist in 2000. In May 2002, they released their debut album, Deus Deceptor, on New Hawen Records in Europe and Century Media in North America. The group attempted to put together a touring lineup in 2002, but this never occurred, in part due to the group members' commitment to other projects. In 2003 Liiva and Modin split from the group, leaving Reinholdz the primary (and only) member. In 2004 Liiva (now with Hearse) confirmed the group's demise. 

In 2011 Nonexist was resurrected as Reinholdz started writing the second album From My Cold Dead Hands. It was then recorded in 2011/2012 with Johan Liiva back on vocals, and released by Pivotal Rockordings in November 2012 and by Japanese label Trooper Entertainment in May 2013. This album was the debut as a producer for Reinholdz, doing all the mixing, producing and mastering himself. The band made their live-debut at the Scorched Tundra Festival in Gothenburg, December 2012. In 2014 Nonexist started recording album number three entitled Throne of Scars. It features nine tracks and is produced and mixed by Johan Reinholdz at Multipass Studios with the assistance of Markus Nilsson at Sunnanå Studio in Malmö. The style of the songs retain the atmosphere from the previous album; dark, intense, varied and heavy while also adding some new influences in the mix. Throne of Scars was mixed and ready in April 2015 and during the same time the band signed a deal with Danish label Mighty Music. The album was released in Japan by Trooper Entertainment, in August and in the rest of the world by Mighty Music on October 10, 2015.

In November 2015 Johan Liiva quit the band and Reinholdz took over the frontman duties doing both guitar and vocals in the studio and also live - where the band now is active with Faithful Darkness members Johan Aldgård and Joakim Strandberg Nilsson as well as Andromeda bass player Linus Abrahamson completing the line-up. 
Nonexist released an EP called The New Flesh which featured songs from Throne of Scars as well as tracks from previous albums with Reinholdz' vocals.

Members
Johan Reinholdz - lead guitar, vocals
Johan Aldgård - rhythm guitar
Linus Abrahamson - bass
Joakim Strandberg Nilsson - drums

Discography

Deus Deceptor (2002,Century Media/Toy's Factory)
From My Cold Dead Hands (2012, Pivotal/Tropper Entertainment )
Throne of Scars (2015, Mighty Music/Trooper Entertainment )
The New Flesh EP (2016, Mighty Music)
''Like the Fearless Hunter (2020, Mighty Music)

References

Swedish melodic death metal musical groups
Musical groups established in 2000
Musical groups disestablished in 2004
Musical groups reestablished in 2011